Mutějovice is a municipality and village in Rakovník District in the Central Bohemian Region of the Czech Republic. It has about 800 inhabitants.

Administrative parts
The village of Lhota pod Džbánem is an administrative part of Mutějovice.

References

Villages in Rakovník District